Edward William Lane (17 September 1801 – 10 August 1876) was a British orientalist, translator and lexicographer. He is known for his Manners and Customs of the Modern Egyptians and the Arabic-English Lexicon, as well as his translations of One Thousand and One Nights and Selections from the Kur-án.

During his lifetime, Lane also wrote a detailed account of Egypt and the country's ancient sites, but the book, titled Description of Egypt, was published posthumously. It was first published by the American University in Cairo Press in 2000 and has been republished several times since then.

Early years
Lane was born at Hereford, England, the third son of the Rev. Dr Theopilus Lane, and grand-nephew of Thomas Gainsborough on his mother's side. After his father's death in 1814, Lane was sent to grammar school at Bath and then Hereford, where he showed a talent for mathematics. He visited Cambridge, but did not enrol in any of its colleges.

Instead, Lane joined his brother Richard in London, studying engraving with him. At the same time Lane began his study of Arabic on his own. However, his health soon deteriorated. For the sake of his health and of a new career, he set sail to Egypt.

Work

Travels in Egypt 
Lane had a few reasons to travel to Egypt. He had been studying Arabic for a long period of time and there had been an explosion of egyptomania in England due to Belzoni's exhibition at the Egyptian Hall and the release of Vivant Denon's Travels in Upper and Lower Egypt during the campaigns of General Bonaparte in that country (1803).  Lane's health was also deteriorating while living in London and he felt that he needed to migrate to a warmer climate during the harsh winter months. During the 1800s, those who spoke Arabic and were familiar with the Near East could easily apply for jobs serving the British government. Lane set sail for Egypt on 18 July 1825.

Lane arrived in Alexandria in September 1825, and soon left for Cairo. He remained in Egypt for two and a half years, mingling with the locals, dressed as a Turk (the ethnicity of the then-dominant Ottoman Empire), taking notes of his experiences and observations. In Old Cairo, he lived near Bab al-Hadid, and studied Arabic with Sheikh Muhammad 'Ayyad al-Tantawi (1810–1861), who was later invited to teach at Saint Petersburg, Russia.

In Egypt, Lane visited coffee shops and the houses of locals, attended a mosque, and familiarized himself with Islam. He also befriended other British travelers in Egypt at that time, including John Gardner Wilkinson, who had been residing in Cairo. Lane also went on a trip down the Nile to Nubia, visiting numerous sites and taking observational notes. On this trip he visited Abydos, Dendera, Luxor, Kom Ombo, Philae, Abu Simbel and a number of other ancient sites. Lane left Egypt on 7 April 1828.

Description of Egypt 
Lane's interest in ancient Egypt may have been first aroused by seeing a presentation by Giovanni Battista Belzoni. His original ambition was to publish an account of what had remained of Ancient Egypt. The London publisher John Murray showed early interest in publishing the project (known as Description of Egypt as an homage to the early 1800s publication, Description de l'Égypte), but then backed out. This rejection was probably due to the fact that the book had detailed accounts of Egypt, numerous illustrations, and texts in Arabic, Ancient Egyptian (hieroglyphics) and Ancient Greek which would significantly raise the cost of printing. Large publications were also going out of fashion and Lane was not himself an established author. Due to financial shortcomings, Lane could not publish the book himself, so it remained unpublished until 2000.

In Description of Egypt, Lane provided descriptions and histories of locations within Egypt that he had visited. He was a devout urban geographer, best illustrated by the fact that he devoted five chapters of the book writing about everything in Cairo: the way the city looks when you approach it, a detailed account of Old Cairo, monuments in the city, the nature around it, etc. He also wrote about rural areas.

Lane also discussed the landscape and geography of Egypt, including its deserts, the Nile and how it was formed, Egyptian agriculture, and the climate. An entire chapter of the book was devoted to a political history of Egypt, with specific attention to the history of Muhammad Ali of Egypt.

Lane's Description of Egypt focuses mainly on Ancient Egypt. Though Lane was not credited as such during his lifetime, his text follows the form of Egyptology. The book included a supplement titled On the Ancient Egyptians in which Lane discusses the origin and physical characteristics of Egyptians, the origin of their civilization, hieroglyphics, Ancient Egyptian religion and law, Egyptian priesthood, Egyptian royalty, the caste system, general manners and customs, sacred architecture and sculpture, agriculture, and commerce. In a letter he wrote to his friend Harriet Martineau, Lane stated that he felt the need to put a lot of effort into staying away from Ancient Egypt; he added that in the previous eight years he could not read a book on the subject as it fascinated him so much that it drew his attention away from his work.

Lane spent 32 days at the Giza pyramid complex, drawing, making sketches, and taking notes for his work. At the complex Lane noted that he saw labourers pulling down some of the stone from the Great Sphinx of Giza to use it for modern buildings. He stayed at the Valley of the Kings for 15 days, sleeping in the tomb of Ramses X, and left detailed accounts of each tomb, concluding that there may be further hidden tombs within the Valley.

160 illustrations accompanied Lane's accounts.

Manners and Customs of the Modern Egyptians 

Since Lane had trouble publishing his Description of Egypt, at the suggestion of John Murray he expanded a chapter of the original project into a separate book. The result was his Manners and Customs of the Modern Egyptians (1836), published by the Society for the Diffusion of Useful Knowledge. The work was partly modelled on Alexander Russell's The Natural History of Aleppo (1756). Lane visited Egypt again in 1833 in order to collect materials to expand and revise the work, after the Society had accepted the publication. The book became a bestseller (still in print), and Lane earned his reputation in the field of Orientalism.

Lane left detailed accounts of everyday life in Egypt in the 19th century, which would prove useful to later researchers. Arthur John Arberry visited Egypt a century after Lane and said that it was like visiting another planet - none of the things Lane had written about were present.

Lane was conscious that his research was handicapped by the fact that gender segregation prevented him from getting a close-up view of Egyptian women - an aspect of Egyptian life that was of particular interest to his readers. He was forced to rely on information passed on by Egyptian men, as he explains:Many husbands of the middle classes, and some of the higher orders, freely talk of the affairs of the ḥareem with one who professes to agree with them in their general moral sentiments, if they have not to converse through the medium of an interpreter. However, in order to gain further information, he would later send for his sister, Sophia Lane Poole, so that she could gain access to women-only areas such as hareems and bathhouses and report on what she found. The result was The Englishwoman in Egypt: Letters from Cairo, written during a residence there in 1842, 3 & 4, with E.W. Lane Esq., Author of "The Modern Egyptians" By His Sister. (Poole's own name does not appear within the publication.) The Englishwoman in Egypt contains large sections of Lane's own unpublished work, altered so that it appears to be from Poole's perspective (for example "my brother" being substituted for "I"). However, it also relates Poole's own experiences in visiting the hareems that were closed to male visitors.

The One Thousand and One Nights 
Lane's next major project was a translation of the One Thousand and One Nights. His version first saw light as a monthly serial from 1838 to 1840, and was published in three volumes in 1840. A revised edition was released in 1859. The encyclopedic annotations from the first edition were published posthumously and separately in 1883 by his great-nephew Stanley Lane-Poole, as Arabian Society in the Middle Ages. Lane's version is bowdlerized, and illustrated by William Harvey.

Opinions vary on the quality of Lane's translation. Stanley Lane-Poole commented that "Lane's version is markedly superior to any other that has appeared in English, if superiority is allowed to be measured by accuracy and an honest and unambitious desire to reproduce the authentic spirit as well as the letter of the original." Nights researcher and author Robert Irwin writes that Lane's "style tends towards the grandiose and mock-biblical... Word order is frequently and pointlessly inverted. Where the style is not pompously high-flown, it is often painfully and uninspiringly literal... It is also peppered with Latinisms."

Lane himself saw the Nights as an edifying work, as he had expressed earlier in a note in his preface to the Manners and Customs, There is one work, however, which represents most admirable pictures of the manners and customs of the Arabs, and particularly of those of the Egyptians; it is 'The Thousand and One Nights; or, Arabian Nights' Entertainments:' if the English reader had possessed a close translation of it with sufficient illustrative notes, I might almost have spared myself the labour of the present undertaking.

Dictionary and other works 

From 1842 onwards, Lane devoted himself to the monumental Arabic-English Lexicon, although he found time to contribute several articles to the journal of Deutsche Morgenländische Gesellschaft. He went to Egypt in 1842 with his wife, two children, and his sister Sophia Lane Poole who was working on her book The Englishwoman in Egypt. On this occasion Lane stayed in Egypt for 7 years, working six days a week on his Lexicon. A local scholar, Ibrahim al-Disqui, helped him with this work. Al-Disqui assisted in locating manuscripts and proofreading these manuscripts for Lane. The two became close during this period and continued to stay friends after they finished the Lexicon.

Lane's Selections from the Kur-án appeared in 1843. It was neither a critical nor a commercial success. Moreover, it was misprint-ridden as Lane was for the third time in Egypt with his family collecting materials for the Arabic-English Lexicon when it was being printed.

Lane was unable to complete his dictionary. He had arrived at the letter Qāf, the 21st letter of the Arabic alphabet, but in 1876 he died at Worthing, Sussex. Lane's great-nephew Stanley Lane-Poole finished the work based on his incomplete notes and published it in the twenty years following his death.

In 1854, an anonymous work entitled The Genesis of the Earth and of Man was published, edited by Lane's nephew Reginald Stuart Poole. The work is attributed by some to Lane.

The part concerning Cairo's early history and topography in Description of Egypt, based on Al-Maqrizi's work and Lane's own observations, was revised by Reginald Stuart Poole in 1847 and published in 1896 as Cairo Fifty Years Ago.

Criticism 

Lane has been criticized for his particularly unsympathetic description of Egypt's Coptic Christian minority, drawn in part from the words of an Egyptian man who presented himself to Lane as a Copt, although other scholars have reported that the interlocutor was, in fact, a Muslim. In his writings, he describes Copts as "of a sullen temper, extremely avaricious, and abominable dissemblers; cringing or domineering according to circumstances. Scholars such as S.H. Leeder have described "a great deal of the morbid prejudice against the Copts" as being inspired by the writings of Lane.

Personal life 
Lane was from a notable Orientalist family. His sister, Sophia Lane Poole, was an Oriental scholar, as were his nephew Reginald Stuart Poole and his great-nephew Stanley Lane-Poole, who were themselves distinguished Oriental scholars and archaeologists. His brother, Richard James Lane, was a notable Victorian-era engraver and lithographer known for his portraits. In 1840, Lane married Nafeesah, a Greek-Egyptian woman who had originally been either presented to him or purchased by him as a slave when she was around eight years old, and whom he had undertaken to educate.

Lane died on 10 August 1876 and was buried at West Norwood Cemetery. His manuscripts and drawings are in the archive of the Griffith Institute, University of Oxford.

See also 
 Orientalism
 Orientalism (book) by Edward Said
 Oriental studies

Notes

References

Sources 
Arberry, A.J. (1960). Oriental Essays. London: George Allen & Unwin.
Dowling, Theodore Edward (1909). The Egyptian Church. London: Cope & Fenwick.
Irwin, Robert (1994). The Arabian Nights: A Companion. London: Allen Lane.
Irwin, Robert (2006). For Lust of Knowing. London: Allen Lane.
Kudsieh, S. 2016. Beyond Colonial Binaries: Amicable Ties among Egyptian and European Scholars, 1820-1850. Alif: Journal of Comparative Poetics, 36: 44.
Lane, Edward William (1973 [1860]). An Account of the Manners and Customs of the Modern Egyptians. With a new introduction by John Manchip White. New York: Dover Publications.
Lane, E. W. 2001. Description of Egypt. Cairo: American University in Cairo.
Lane-Poole, S. 1877. Life of Edward William Lane. London: Williams and Norgate.
Leeder, S.H. (1918). Modern Sons of the Pharaohs. London and New York: Hodder & Stoughton.
Roper, Geoffrey (1998). "Texts from Nineteenth-Century Egypt: The Role of E. W. Lane", in Paul and Janet Starky (eds) Travellers in Egypt, London; New York: I.B. Tauris, pp. 244–254.
Thompson, Jason (1996). "Edward William Lane's 'Description of Egypt'". International Journal of Middle East Studies, 28 (4): 565-583.

Biographies 
Ahmed, Leila (1978). Edward W Lane. London: Longman.
Lane-Poole, Stanley (1877). Life of Edward William Lane. London: Williams and Norgate.
Thompson, Jason (2010). Edward William Lane: The Life of the Pioneering Egyptologist and Orientalist, 1801-1876. Cairo: American University in Cairo Press.

External links 

 
 
Lane's Arabic-English lexicon in the DjVu fileformat: Downloadable At Archive.org In Eight Parts. Each part is about 20 megabytes. See also the related copyright details.
Edward William Lane, An Arabic-English Lexicon, ا
Catalogue of the Edward Lane manuscripts in the Archive of the Griffith Institute, University of Oxford

1801 births
1876 deaths
19th-century lexicographers
British Arabists
British orientalists
Burials at West Norwood Cemetery
English orientalists
People from Hereford
Translators from Arabic
Translators of One Thousand and One Nights
Translators of the Quran into English
19th-century British translators
Lane family
People from Broadwater, West Sussex
Giza pyramid complex